The yellow-crowned barbet (Psilopogon henricii) is a species of bird in the Megalaimidae family.
It is found in Brunei, Indonesia, Malaysia, Singapore, and Thailand.
Its natural habitats are subtropical or tropical moist lowland forests and subtropical or tropical swamps.
It is threatened by habitat loss.

References

yellow-crowned barbet
Birds of Malesia
yellow-crowned barbet
Taxonomy articles created by Polbot
Taxobox binomials not recognized by IUCN